Li Hanbo (Chinese: 李翰博; Pinyin: Lǐ Hànbó; born 26 January 1991) is a Chinese football player who currently plays for Beijing Guoan in the Chinese Super League.

Club career
Li started his football career in 2011 when he was promoted to Beijing Guoan's first team squad by Jaime Pacheco. On 16 May 2012, he made his senior debut in the last round of 2012 AFC Champions League group stage which Beijing tied with Brisbane Roar 1–1. He scored his first senior goal assisted by Shao Jiayi in the 34th minute,  which was selected by the fans as AFC goal of year 2012 in December 2012.

Career statistics
Statistics accurate as of match played 4 November 2017.

References

1991 births
Living people
Footballers from Shenyang
Chinese footballers
Beijing Guoan F.C. players
Chinese Super League players
Association football midfielders